Netti is a feminine variant of Antoinette.  Notable people with this nickname include:

Nickname
Netti Witziers-Timmer, legal name Jeannette Josephina Maria Witziers-Timmer (1923–2005), Dutch sprint runner
Netti Shanker Yadav, nickname of Mettu Shanker Yadav (born 1962), Indian politician

Surname
Francesco Netti (1832–1894), Italian painter
Giovanni Cesare Netti (1649–1686), Italian composer

See also

Netta (name)
Netti (disambiguation)
Nettie (name)
Netto
Netty (name)
Nitti (disambiguation)
Notti (disambiguation)

Notes